Denholm is a surname. Notable people with the surname include:

 Anne Denholm (born 1991), Welsh harpist
 Danny Denholm (born 1990), Scottish footballer
 David Denholm (1924–1997), Australian historian and author
 Frank E. Denholm (1923–2016), American politician
 George Denholm (1908–1997), British fighter pilot
 Iain Denholm (born 1948), Scottish footballer
 Lynn Denholm (born 1939), Australian cricketer
 Noël Denholm-Young, English historian
 Robyn Denholm (born 1962/1963), Australian businesswoman, chair of Tesla, Inc.
 Tabitha Denholm (born 1975), British director of music videos, documentary shorts and commercials

See also
 Noël Denholm-Young (1904-1975), English historian
 Denholm (disambiguation)